Giuseppe Pugliese (born 4 November 1983) is an Italian football coach and a former player who played as a defender.

Club career

Early career

Verona
Pugliese was signed by Verona in February 2009. In 2010 he left for Serie B Varese on a temporary basis. Pugliese returned to Verona on 1 July 2011. Despite assigned a shirt number in 2012–13 Serie B season (number 27), he did not play any game. Verona promoted at the end of season. It also saw the club transferred Pugliese to another Veneto based club: Cittadella.

Cittadella

Salernitana, Arezzo and Monza
Pugliese was signed by Salernitana on 28 August 2014. On 3 September he was signed by Arezzo.

On 23 January 2015 Pugliese was signed by Monza.

References

External links 
 Hellas Verona F.C. Official Player Profile 

1983 births
Living people
Sportspeople from the Metropolitan City of Bari
Italian footballers
Association football defenders
A.S. Noicattaro Calcio players
Hellas Verona F.C. players
S.S.D. Varese Calcio players
A.S. Cittadella players
Serie B players
Serie C players
Serie D players
Italian football managers
Serie D managers
Footballers from Apulia